Düzköy (Laz: ჩხალა/Çxala; Georgian: ჩხალა/Chkhala) is a village in the Borçka District, Artvin Province, Turkey. Its population is 677 (2021).

References

Villages in Borçka District